The 13th Carnatic Battalion could refer  to

72nd Punjabis in 1769
73rd Carnatic Infantry in 1776